Władysław Witwicki (30 April 1878, Lubaczów – 21 December 1948, Konstancin) was a Polish psychologist, philosopher, translator (mainly of Plato's works into Polish), historian (of philosophy and art) and artist. He is seen as one of the fathers of psychology in Poland.

Witwicki was also the creator of the theory of cratism, theory of feelings, and he dealt with the issues of the psychology of religion, and the creation of secular ethics. He was one of the initiators and co-founders of Polish Philosophical Society. He is one of the thinkers associated with the Lwów–Warsaw school.

Background 
Władysław Witwicki was the fifth child of Urszula Witwicka, born Woińska (niece of the Metropolitan Archbishop of the Roman Catholic Archdiocese of Lviv, Łukasz Baraniecki), and Ludwik–Filip Wasylkowicz Witwicki, as well as father of Janusz Witwicki, the creators of the Plastic Panorama of Old Lviv.

He graduated from the University of Lviv, was a student of Kazimierz Twardowski. He also studied at the University of Vienna (under the direction of Alois Höfler) and at the Leipzig University (under the direction of Wilhelm Wundt). He lectured at the University of Lviv and became a professor at the University of Warsaw (1919–1948).

Works
Witwicki is the author of the first Polish textbooks on psychology. He also collaborated with other philosophers. For instance, he worked with Bronisław Bandrowski to develop a model of psychology based on Franz Brentano's theory on phenomenology. It included an analysis of Edmund Husserl's Theory of Content and the Phenomenon of Thinking.

In the comments to his own translation of the Gospels of Matthew and Mark – Dobra Nowina według Mateusza i Marka – Witwicki challenges the mental health of Jesus. He attributed to Jesus subjectivism, increased sense of his own power and superiority over others, egocentrism and the tendency to subjugate other people, as well as difficulties communicating with the outside world and multiple personality disorder, which made him a schizothymic or even schizophrenic type (according to the Ernst Kretschmer's typology).

Artistic activities 

Witwicki illustrated books (including his own translations), created watercolors, etchings, woodcuts, bookplates. He designed magazine covers, cast plaster busts, sculpted, reviewed exhibitions, presented artists' profiles. He helped his son Janusz create  the Plastic Panorama of Old Lviv. He lectured and wrote articles about art, and authored textbooks for visual artists: Wiadomości o stylach (About Styles); O widzeniu przedmiotów: Zasady perspektywy (Seeing Objects: Principles of Perspective); Anatomia plastyczna (Plastic Anatomy [?]).

Selected publications
 Translations of Plato's dialogues
 Psychologia do użytku słuchaczów wyższych szkół naukowych, vol. 1–2 (1925–1927)
 Wiadomości o stylach (1934)
 Wiara oświeconych, 1959 (fr.: La foi des éclairés, 1939)
 Przechadzki ateńskie (a series of radio programs, 1939, issued in 1947)
 Translations of the Gospel of Matthew and the Gospel of Mark with psychological analysis: Dobra Nowina według Mateusza i Marka (The Good News according to Matthew and Mark); written in 1942, issued in 1958

See also
 History of philosophy in Poland
 List of Poles
 List of psychologists

References

Sources

External links 
 Works of Władysław Witwicki on digital library Polona 

1878 births
1948 deaths
Polish psychologists
Polish historians of philosophy
Polish art historians
Polish translators
Polish artists
20th-century Polish educators
20th-century Polish philosophers
People from Lubaczów
University of Lviv alumni
Academic staff of the University of Warsaw